Tmesisternus is a genus of longhorn beetles belonging to the family Cerambycidae, subfamily Lamiinae.

Species
Tmesisternus contains the following species:

 Tmesisternus abmisibilis Withaar, 2011
 Tmesisternus adspersarius Breuning, 1939
 Tmesisternus adspersus Blanchard, 1953
 Tmesisternus aeneofasciatus Breuning, 1948
 Tmesisternus affinis Breuning, 1939
 Tmesisternus agrarius Pascoe, 1867 
 Tmesisternus agriloides Pascoe, 1867
 Tmesisternus albari Withaar, 2009
 Tmesisternus albertisi Breuning, 1939
 Tmesisternus albovittatus Breuning, 1939
 Tmesisternus andaii Gilmour, 1952
 Tmesisternus andreas (Kreische, 1926)
 Tmesisternus angae Gressitt, 1984
 Tmesisternus anomalus Gressitt, 1984
 Tmesisternus apicalis Aurivillius, 1927
 Tmesisternus arabukae Gressitt, 1984
 Tmesisternus araucarius Withaar, 2017
 Tmesisternus arfakianus Gestro, 1876
 Tmesisternus asaroanus Gressitt, 1984
 Tmesisternus assimilis Breuning, 1975
 Tmesisternus atrofasciatus Gressitt, 1984
 Tmesisternus attenuatus Gressitt, 1984
 Tmesisternus aubrooki Gilmour, 1949
 Tmesisternus avarus Pascoe, 1867
 Tmesisternus batchianensis Breuning, 1954
 Tmesisternus bazuini Withaar, 2011
 Tmesisternus beehleri Gressitt, 1984
 Tmesisternus benjamini Breuning, 1966
 Tmesisternus bezarki Weigel, 2006
 Tmesisternus biarciferus Blanchard, 1953
 Tmesisternus bifoveatus Aurivillius, 1924
 Tmesisternus bifuscomaculatus Breuning, 1939
 Tmesisternus bilaterimaculatus Breuning, 1966
 Tmesisternus bioculatus Gressitt, 1984
 Tmesisternus bizonulatus Guerin-Meneville, 1831
 Tmesisternus bodemensis Withaar, 2011
 Tmesisternus bolanicus Breuning, 1939
 Tmesisternus bosavi Gressitt, 1984
 Tmesisternus bosaviensis Gressitt, 1984
 Tmesisternus bosavius Withaar, 2017
 Tmesisternus brandti Gressitt, 1984
 Tmesisternus brassi Gressitt, 1984
 Tmesisternus breuningi Gilmour, 1950
 Tmesisternus brevespinosus Breuning & de Jong, 1941
 Tmesisternus bruijni Gestro, 1876
 Tmesisternus burgersi Withaar, 2017
 Tmesisternus canofasciatus (Aurivillius, 1927)
 Tmesisternus carlae Withaar, 2017
 Tmesisternus cinnamomeus Gilmour, 1950
 Tmesisternus clissoldi Withaar, 2018
 Tmesisternus coloribus Withaar, 2018
 Tmesisternus conicicollis (Thomson, 1864)
 Tmesisternus convexus Gressitt, 1984
 Tmesisternus costatus Breuning, 1939
 Tmesisternus costiceps Breuning, 1967
 Tmesisternus costipennis Breuning, 1940
 Tmesisternus costulatus Breuning, 1939
 Tmesisternus cuneatus Gressitt, 1984
 Tmesisternus cupreosignatus Aurivillius, 1907	 
 Tmesisternus curvatolineatus (Aurivillius, 1927)
 Tmesisternus defobi Withaar, 2009
 Tmesisternus demissus Breuning, 1939
 Tmesisternus densepunctatus Breuning, 1939
 Tmesisternus denticollis Gressitt, 1984
 Tmesisternus devosi Withaar, 2009
 Tmesisternus digoelae Withaar, 2018
 Tmesisternus discomaculatus Breuning, 1939
 Tmesisternus dissimilis Pascoe, 1867
 Tmesisternus distinctus Boisduval, 1935
 Tmesisternus divisus Aurivillius, 1927	 
 Tmesisternus dohertyi Jordan, 1894
 Tmesisternus dubius Montrouzier, 1855
 Tmesisternus elateroides Gestro, 1876
 Tmesisternus elegans Heller, 1914
 Tmesisternus eliptaminus Withaar, 2014
 Tmesisternus ellenae Withaar, 2017
 Tmesisternus elvirae Weigel, 2003
 Tmesisternus excellens Aurivillius, 1908
 Tmesisternus finisterrae Gressitt, 1984
 Tmesisternus flavolineatipennis Breuning, 1975
 Tmesisternus flavolineatus Breuning, 1939
 Tmesisternus flavovittatus Breuning & de Jong, 1941
 Tmesisternus floorjansenae Weigel, 2018
 Tmesisternus florensis Breuning, 1948
 Tmesisternus floresianus Withaar, 2009
 Tmesisternus flyensis Gressitt, 1984
 Tmesisternus frogatti Macleay, 1886
 Tmesisternus fulgens Breuning, 1939
 Tmesisternus fumatus Gressitt, 1984
 Tmesisternus fuscosignatus Breuning, 1945
 Tmesisternus gabrieli Schwarzer, 1931
 Tmesisternus geelvinkianus Gestro, 1876
 Tmesisternus geniculatus Breuning, 1948
 Tmesisternus gerstmeieri Weigel, 2018
 Tmesisternus giluwe Gressitt, 1984
 Tmesisternus glabrum Withaar, 2013
 Tmesisternus goilalae Gressitt, 1984
 Tmesisternus gracilis Gressitt, 1984
 Tmesisternus gressitti Weigel, 2001
 Tmesisternus grimmi Weigel, 2018
 Tmesisternus griseovittatus Breuning, 1939
 Tmesisternus griseus (Thomson, 1865)
 Tmesisternus habbemanus Gressitt, 1984
 Tmesisternus helleri Kreische, 1926
 Tmesisternus herbaceus Pascoe, 1862
 Tmesisternus heurni (Schwarzer, 1924)
 Tmesisternus hieroglyphicus Blanchard, 1853
 Tmesisternus holzschuhi Weigel, 2018
 Tmesisternus hoyoisi Weigel, 2006
 Tmesisternus huedepohli Weigel, 2018
 Tmesisternus humeralis Aurivillius, 1923
 Tmesisternus imitans Breuning, 1939
 Tmesisternus immitis Pascoe, 1867
 Tmesisternus indistinctelineatus Breuning, 1966
 Tmesisternus insularis Gressitt, 1984
 Tmesisternus intricatus Pascoe, 1867
 Tmesisternus irregularis Gestro, 1876
 Tmesisternus isabellae Vollenhoven, 1871
 Tmesisternus jakli Weigel, 2018
 Tmesisternus japeni Gilmour, 1949
 Tmesisternus jaspideus Boisduval, 1853
 Tmesisternus joliveti Breuning, 1970
 Tmesisternus kaindi Gressitt, 1985
 Tmesisternus kapauku Gressitt, 1984
 Tmesisternus karimui Gressitt, 1984
 Tmesisternus keitocali Breuning, 1972
 Tmesisternus kurima Weigel, 2018
 Tmesisternus lacustris Gressitt, 1984
 Tmesisternus laensis Gressitt, 1984
 Tmesisternus laevis Breuning, 1976
 Tmesisternus lamingtonus Gressitt, 1984
 Tmesisternus lansbergei Breuning, 1945
 Tmesisternus lateralis Macleay, 1886
 Tmesisternus laterimaculatus Gilmour, 1949
 Tmesisternus latifascia Heller, 1914
 Tmesisternus latithorax Gressitt, 1984
 Tmesisternus lepidus Pascoe, 1867
 Tmesisternus lictorius (Pascoe, 1867)
 Tmesisternus liebeni Withaar, 2009
 Tmesisternus lineatus Macleay, 1886
 Tmesisternus loebli Weigel, 2018
 Tmesisternus lordbergia Withaar, 2011
 Tmesisternus lotor Pascoe, 1959
 Tmesisternus lucens Breuning, 1970
 Tmesisternus ludificator (Heller, 1914)
 Tmesisternus lugubris Breuning, 1939
 Tmesisternus luteostriatus Heller, 1912 
 Tmesisternus maai Gressitt, 1984
 Tmesisternus mamberamo Gressitt, 1984
 Tmesisternus margaretae Gilmour, 1949
 Tmesisternus marginalis Breuning, 1939
 Tmesisternus marmoratus Guerin-Meneville, 1831
 Tmesisternus mehli Weigel, 2008
 Tmesisternus meridionalis Gressitt, 1984
 Tmesisternus metalliceps Breuning, 1940
 Tmesisternus mewana Withaar, 2018
 Tmesisternus mimethes (Kreische, 1926)
 Tmesisternus modestus Gahan, 1915
 Tmesisternus mokwamensis Withaar, 2013
 Tmesisternus montanus Gressitt, 1984
 Tmesisternus monteithi Gressitt, 1984
 Tmesisternus monticola Gestro, 1876
 Tmesisternus mucronatus Gahan, 1915
 Tmesisternus multiplicatus Gahan, 1915
 Tmesisternus nabirensis Gressitt, 1984
 Tmesisternus nami Gressitt, 1984
 Tmesisternus nielsius Withaar, 2017
 Tmesisternus niger Gressitt, 1984
 Tmesisternus nigrofasciatus Aurivillius, 1908
 Tmesisternus nigrotriangularis Heller, 1914
 Tmesisternus nitidus Gressitt, 1984
 Tmesisternus obliquefasciatus Breuning, 1939
 Tmesisternus obliquelineatus Breuning, 1939
 Tmesisternus obliquevittatus Breuning, 1973
 Tmesisternus oblongus Boisduval, 1835
 Tmesisternus obsoletus Blanchard, 1953
 Tmesisternus obtusatus Gressitt, 1984
 Tmesisternus ochraceosignatus Breuning, 1939
 Tmesisternus ochreomaculatus Breuning, 1942
 Tmesisternus ochrostictus Gressitt, 1984
 Tmesisternus octopunctatus Gilmour, 1949
 Tmesisternus olthofi Gressitt, 1984
 Tmesisternus opalescens Pascoe, 1867
 Tmesisternus oransbarius Withaar, 2016
 Tmesisternus ornatus Breuning, 1939
 Tmesisternus paniae Gressitt, 1984
 Tmesisternus papuanus Breuning, 1945
 Tmesisternus parasulcatus Breuning, 1975
 Tmesisternus parobiensis Breuning, 1969
 Tmesisternus parvus Withaar, 2016
 Tmesisternus pauli (Heller, 1897)
 Tmesisternus persimilis Breuning, 1969
 Tmesisternus petechialis Pascoe, 1867
 Tmesisternus phaleratus (Thomson, 1865)
 Tmesisternus planicollis Gressitt, 1884
 Tmesisternus planus Withaar, 2016
 Tmesisternus pleuristictus Pascoe, 1867
 Tmesisternus politus Blanchard, 1853
 Tmesisternus popondettae Gressitt, 1984
 Tmesisternus postfasciatus Breuning & de Jong, 1941
 Tmesisternus postflavescens Breuning, 1948
 Tmesisternus postglaber Breuning, 1966
 Tmesisternus prasinatus Heller, 1914
 Tmesisternus pseudintricatus Breuning, 1939
 Tmesisternus pseudirregularis Breuning, 1939
 Tmesisternus pseudissimilis Withaar, 2016
 Tmesisternus pseudohieroglyphicus Breuning, 1939
 Tmesisternus pseudomonticola Breuning, 1939
 Tmesisternus pseudosuperans Breuning, 1939
 Tmesisternus pseudotesselatus Breuning, 1939
 Tmesisternus pseudoviridescens Breuning, 1939
 Tmesisternus pteridophytae Gressitt, 1984
 Tmesisternus pullus Breuning, 1945
 Tmesisternus pulvereoides Breuning, 1975
 Tmesisternus pulvereus Pascoe, 1867
 Tmesisternus quadrimaculatus Aurivillius, 1908
 Tmesisternus quadriplagiatus Breuning, 1939
 Tmesisternus quadripunctatus Gressitt, 1949
 Tmesisternus quadripustulatus Gressitt, 1984
 Tmesisternus quateae Withaar, 2014
 Tmesisternus ramues Withaar, 2016
 Tmesisternus ramues. Withaar, 2018
 Tmesisternus reductus Gressitt, 1984
 Tmesisternus renii Gressitt, 1984
 Tmesisternus replicatus Gressitt, 1984
 Tmesisternus riedeli Weigel, 2004
 Tmesisternus rossi Gressitt, 1984
 Tmesisternus rotundipennis Breuning, 1958
 Tmesisternus ruficornis (Thomson, 1865)
 Tmesisternus rufipes Blanchard, 1853
 Tmesisternus rufotriangularis Gressitt, 1984
 Tmesisternus salomonus (Aurivillius, 1920)
 Tmesisternus samuelsoni Gressitt, 1984
 Tmesisternus schaumii Pascoe, 1867
 Tmesisternus schepmani (Withaar, 2015)
 Tmesisternus schraderi Kreische, 1926
 Tmesisternus schutzei Withaar, 2018
 Tmesisternus sedlaceki Gressitt, 1984
 Tmesisternus semivittatus Breuning, 1945
 Tmesisternus separatus (Aurivillius, 1927)
 Tmesisternus sepicanus (Kreische, 1926)
 Tmesisternus septempunctatus Boisduval, 1835
 Tmesisternus seriemaculatus Breuning, 1939
 Tmesisternus sexcostatus Withaar, 2013
 Tmesisternus sexmaculatus Breuning & de Jong, 1941
 Tmesisternus shanahani Withaar, 2014
 Tmesisternus skalei Weigel, 2018
 Tmesisternus soembanus (Schwarzer, 1931)
 Tmesisternus speciosus Pascoe, 1867
 Tmesisternus stellae Gressitt, 1984
 Tmesisternus strigosus Pascoe, 1867
 Tmesisternus subadspersus Breuning, 1966
 Tmesisternus subalpinus Gressitt, 1984
 Tmesisternus subaureus Gressitt, 1984
 Tmesisternus subbilineatus Breuning, 1966
 Tmesisternus subchlorus (Heller, 1914)
 Tmesisternus subsimilis Breuning, 1966
 Tmesisternus subtriangularis Breuning, 1966
 Tmesisternus subuniformis Gressitt, 1984
 Tmesisternus subvenatus Breuning, 1959
 Tmesisternus subvinculatus Breuning, 1961
 Tmesisternus sulcatellus Breuning, 1984
 Tmesisternus sulcatus Aurivillius, 1911
 Tmesisternus superans (Pascoe, 1868)
 Tmesisternus sylvanicus Gressitt, 1984
 Tmesisternus szentivanyi Gressitt, 1984
 Tmesisternus telnovi Weigel, 2018
 Tmesisternus teragrammus Gilmour, 1950
 Tmesisternus tersus Pascoe, 1862
 Tmesisternus tessellatus Boisduval, 1835
 Tmesisternus testegaus Withaar, 2016
 Tmesisternus timorlautensis Breuning, 1939
 Tmesisternus tolai Gressitt, 1984
 Tmesisternus torridus Pascoe, 1867
 Tmesisternus toxopei Gressitt, 1984
 Tmesisternus transversatus Breuning, 1939
 Tmesisternus transversefasciatus Breuning, 1939
 Tmesisternus transversevittatus Breuning, 1956
 Tmesisternus transversus Pascoe, 1867
 Tmesisternus trapezicollis (Heller, 1914)
 Tmesisternus triangularis Breuning, 1953
 Tmesisternus trilineatus Breuning, 1966
 Tmesisternus ubelsae Withaar, 2016
 Tmesisternus udoschmidti Weigel, 2018
 Tmesisternus unipunctatus Guerin, 1835
 Tmesisternus vagefasciatus Breuning, 1939
 Tmesisternus vagejaspideus Gilmour, 1949
 Tmesisternus vagus (Thomson, 1865)
 Tmesisternus variegatus Gressitt, 1984
 Tmesisternus venatus (Thomson, 1864)
 Tmesisternus villaris Pascoe, 1867
 Tmesisternus vinculatus Heller, 1914
 Tmesisternus virens Gressitt, 1984
 Tmesisternus virescens Breuning, 1939
 Tmesisternus viridescens (Thomson, 1864)
 Tmesisternus viridipennis Breuning, 1940
 Tmesisternus viridis Gestro, 1867
 Tmesisternus wallacei (Pascoe, 1858)
 Tmesisternus wasiorensis Withaar, 2013
 Tmesisternus watutius Withaar, 2016
 Tmesisternus wauensis Gressitt, 1984
 Tmesisternus weigeli Withaar, 2009
 Tmesisternus wiedenfeldi Aurivillius, 1911
 Tmesisternus yokoi Weigel, 2010
 Tmesisternus ziczac Breuning, 1939

References

Tmesisternini